Ralf Tribuntsov (born 22 September 1994 in Silkeborg, Denmark) is an backstroke, butterfly, freestyle and medley Estonian swimmer. He is 28-time long course and 19-time short course Estonian swimming champion. He has broken 31 Estonian records in swimming.

See also
 List of Estonian records in swimming

References

External links
Ralf Tribuntsov at ESBL

1994 births
Living people
People from Silkeborg
Estonian male backstroke swimmers
Estonian male butterfly swimmers
Estonian male freestyle swimmers
Estonian male medley swimmers
21st-century Estonian people
Estonian swimming coaches